Miguel Angel Sanchez may refer to:
Miguel Ángel Sánchez (Argentine footballer) (1936–2008)
Míchel (footballer, born 1975) (Miguel Ángel Sánchez Muñoz, born 1975), Spanish footballer
Miguel Ángel Sánchez (Nicaraguan footballer) (born 1980), Nicaraguan footballer
Miguel Ángel Sánchez (cyclist) (born 1943), Costa Rican Olympic cyclist

See also
 Ángel Sánchez (disambiguation)